Patrol is a Singaporean action drama produced by Singapore Broadcasting Corporation (SBC) (now MediaCorp) in 1989.

Story
The series chronicles the lives of several traffic police officers on the job and how they deal with difficult situations.

Cast
Edmund Chen 陈之财 as Luo Yi Feng 罗一峰
Xiang Yun 向云 as Zhou Hui Juan 周惠娟
Zoe Tay 郑惠玉 as Lin Bi Qing 林碧卿
Chen Anna 陈安娜 as Ma Yu Ru 马玉如
Yan Bingliang 严炳樑 as Ma Biao 马彪
Huang Shinan 黄世南 as Ji Gang 纪刚
Sean Say 成建辉 as Bai Qing Shui 白清水
Liang Weidong 梁维东 as Bai Qing Chi 白清池
Chen Guohua 陈国华 as Li Mu Quan 李木泉
Wang Guanwu 王官武 as CID - Ming 明
Tommy Wong 王昌黎 as CID - Yuan 元
Zhang Shuifa 张水发 as Michael 迈克
Yang Junhe 杨竣贺 as Luo Wen Bin 罗文彬
Zeng Sipei 曾思佩 as Chen Gui Jiao 陈贵娇
Wu Weiqiang 邬伟强 as Lin Guishan 林贵山
Li Gongyu 李功玉 as Li Ping 李萍
Richard Low 刘谦益 as A Yong 阿勇
Chen Xiang 陈翔 as Xiao Yang 小扬
Lin Jinchi 林金池 as William
He Qitang 何其糖 as Peter 彼得
Lin Guiye 林桂叶 as Chen Ma Li 陈玛莉
Zhong Shurong 钟树荣 as Zhang Jin Shi 张金狮
Lai Xianghua 赖向华 as Zhu Yong Tai 朱永泰
Su Feifeng 苏飞凤 as Yong Tai's Grandma 永泰婆婆
Chen Hanwei 陈汉玮 as Student 留学生 (Cameo Appearance 客串)
Huang Biren 黄碧仁 as Student 留学生 (Cameo Appearance 客串)

Significance
Patrol featured the early appearances of young SBC actors such as Xiang Yun, Edmund Chen, Zoe Tay, Chen Hanwei and Huang Biren who would go on to become some of MediaCorp's most prolific artistes of their generation winning numerous awards and nominations at the Star Awards. This series was one of Ang Eng Tee's early works; he would go on to produce popular and critically acclaimed dramas such as Holland V, The Little Nyonya, Together and Breakout. This was also the series that have led Xiang Yun and Edmund Chen being together and got married less than two months after first meeting on set.

It was one of the early police procedural drama series featuring the Singapore Police Force.

References

External links
Patrol theme song on YouTube

Singapore Chinese dramas